Maggie Doyne (Nepali: म्यागी डोएन) (born c. 1986) is an American philanthropist who has built a children's home, women's center and school in Surkhet, Nepal. She was nameed a CNN Hero in 2015. She is the author of Between the Mountain and the Sky: A Mother’s Story of Love, Loss, Healing, and Hope (2022).

Early life
Doyne grew up in Mendham Borough, New Jersey with parents Steve and Nancy Doyne and sisters Kate and Libby.  After she was born, her father quit his job as the manager of a natural food store to be a stay-at-home dad, while her mother worked in real estate. Doyne attended West Morris Mendham High School.

First visit to Nepal
In 2005, following her high school graduation, Doyne took a "gap year" to travel with the organization LeapNow. During that trip, she spent time volunteering at a children's home in northern India. While there, Doyne became friends with a refugee from Nepal and during a cease-fire in the Nepalese Civil War, went with her to visit her home village.

In Nepal, Doyne met six-year-old Hima, who was barely surviving on the few rupees she earned by breaking stones in a dry riverbed and selling them. Doyne helped Hima go to school, paying for her tuition, uniform, and books, and expanded her efforts to help more children. Doyne used $5,000 she had saved from babysitting to help even more children and phoned her parents at home to send her the money.

With her money and more funds from supporters worldwide, Doyne purchased land in the Surkhet valley. Top Malla, a Nepali that Doyne had met in India, joined her as a project partner.

Her project in Nepal now runs a school, children's home, women's center, and girls' safe house.

Blinknow Foundation

The BlinkNow Foundation is a non-profit organization founded by Doyne in 2007 that provides financial support and management oversight to the Kopila Valley School, Children’s Home, Women’s Center, Health Clinic, Big Sisters' Home, and New Campus in Surkhet, Nepal. The Foundation is the sole provider of funding and is the only recipient of BlinkNow funding. The Foundation is an official 501(c)(3) organization with a US-based board. It has headquarters located in the United States and Nepal. BlinkNow operates at the grassroots level of community and focuses on promoting sustainability and self-reliance in the Surkhet community.

Kopila Valley

Kopila Valley, Doyne's project funded by The BlinkNow Foundation, encompasses a school, a children's home, a women's center, a girls' safe house, and a health clinic with a focus in sustainability. 

Dissatisfied with the education her children were receiving and wanting to help other children in the community, Doyne opened the Kopila Valley School in 2010 and it has 400 students. Many are the first in their families to attend school. The school provides students with health care and food, and employs around 50 Nepalis, including teachers, staff, a principal, vice-principal, health administrator, counselor and a health technician. The curriculum supplements the Nepali national curriculum with additional teaching and learning in literature, art, theater, music and sports. Classes are taught in both Nepali and English, and stress creative and critical thinking. In 2012-2013, the school's 8th grade students took national examinations for the first time Nepal's District Level Examination. All students scored within the top 10% nationwide, 50% of students scored in the top 1% nationwide and the school was ranked first in its region for academic achievement. The school receives over 200 applications for places per year and places are offered on the basis of need. 

In 2007, the Kopila Valley Children’s Home opened, and became the legal guardian for more than 45 children. Doyne and Nepali caregivers care for the children.
 
The Kopila Valley Women's Center opened in 2013 providing literacy and vocational skills training to the women of Surkhet. The Women’s Center also runs a storefront, partially staffed by previous trainees, located in Surkhet. The store sells goods to the local community and provides uniforms for the Kopila Valley School. 

In 2011, the Kopila Valley Health Clinic opened in partnership with the Kopila Valley School. This community health clinic’s main focus is in education and prevention. It offers essential primary care, dental care, and mental health services to the Kopila Valley children and staff, as well as the larger Surkhet community. 

The Kopila Valley Big Sisters' Home opened in 2017 in order to provide a safe environment for the most at-risk young female students of Kopila Valley School. It is home to 10 girls and offers counseling, love, and support as they prepare to reintegrate with their biological families or guardians.  

Doyne and her team built a sustainable campus for Kopila Valley in 2018, now the greenest school in Nepal. A team of engineers, architects, developers and environmental experts incorporated sustainable and green techniques to build the school. The new Kopila Valley School is on almost three acres of purchased land – serving as pre-primary school, primary school, secondary school through 12th grade, post-secondary school and vocational center. There are 18 classrooms for more than 400 students. The new campus also has a farm and fruit nursery supplying food products to the Kopila Valley School and Kopila Valley Children’s Home.

In 2022 Doyne published Between the Mountain and the Sky, A Mother's Story of Love, Loss, Healing and Hope.

Recognition
 2008 CosmoGirl of the Year
 2009 Grand Prize Winner of the Do Something Awards 
 2012 Speaker at Forbes 400 Summit on Philanthropy 
 2013 Speaker at Forbes Women's Summit: Power Redefined 
 2013 Forbes Excellence in Education Award 
 2014 Unsung Hero of Compassion, awarded by the Dalai Lama 
 2015 CNN Hero of the Year

References

External links

 Blinknow.org
 The New York Times Magazine, The DIY Way
 The New York Times Magazine, D.I.Y Foreign-Aid Revolution
 The Do Lectures, Maggie Doyne 2010 Talk
 Fast Company, Change Generation: Maggie Doyne, Founder & Director, Kopila Valley Children's Home
 The Huffington Post, New Jersey 20-Year-Old Builds Orphanage in Nepal
 Time Magazine for Kids, She's Changing the World
 Gail Mooney, 2012 Opening Our Eyes, a documentary about Maggie Doyne and other change makers around the world
 Nepal (season 3 episode), 35 minute documentary about Maggie Doyne and the BlinkNow foundation, Dutch and English spoken, with English subtitling.

1987 births
Living people
Philanthropists from New Jersey
People from Mendham Borough, New Jersey
West Morris Mendham High School alumni
American women philanthropists